The 1991–92 Yorkshire Cup was the eighty-fourth occasion on which the  Yorkshire Cup competition had been held.

Cup holders, Castleford, retained the trophy by beating Bradford Northern by the score of 28-6

The match was played at Elland Road,  Leeds, now in West Yorkshire. The attendance was 8,916 and receipts were £?

This was the eighth time in the incredible eleven-year period in which Castleford. previously only once winners in 1977–78, had made eight appearances in the Yorkshire Cup final, winning on four and ending as runner-up on four occasions. It was also the second year in succession that Castleford had won the trophy. within that eleven-year period.

Background 
This season there were no junior/amateur clubs taking part, no "leavers" but one new entrant in the  form of Scarborough Pirates and so the total of entries increased by one from  last season, to a total of nineteen.

This in turn resulted in the necessity to continue with a preliminary round to reduce the  number of clubs entering the first round to sixteen.

Competition and results

Preliminary round 
Involved 3 matches and 6 clubs

Round 1 
Involved  8 matches (with no byes) and 16 clubs

Round 2 - Quarter-finals 
Involved 4 matches and 8 clubs

Round 2 - replays  
Involved  1 match and 2 clubs

Round 3 – Semi-finals  
Involved 2 matches and 4 clubs

Final

Teams and scorers 

Scoring - Try = four points - Goal = two points - Drop goal = one point

The road to success 
The  following chart excludes any preliminary round fixtures/results

Notes and comments 
1 * The first match to be played in the Yorkshire Cup by newly elected to the league Scarborough Pirates (this was also the  club's very first match to be played)

2 * The second (and last) Yorkshire Cup match to be played by Scarborough Pirates, who folded after just one season after reputedly losing over £100,000

3 * The first match to be played by Hull Kingston Rovers since moving into their new purpose built stadium

4 * The first Yorkshire Cup match to be played by Keighley Cougars after the re-branding of the club and the stadium with the Cougars suffix

5 * The first Yorkshire Cup match to be played by Sheffield Eagles since moving into their new home at Don Valley Stadium

6 * Elland Road,  Leeds,  is the home ground of Leeds United A.F.C. with a capacity of 37,914 (The record attendance was 57,892 set on 15 March 1967 for a cup match Leeds v Sunderland). The ground was originally established in 1897 by Holbeck RLFC who played there until their demise after the conclusion of the 1903-04 season

General information for those unfamiliar 
The Rugby League Yorkshire Cup competition was a knock-out competition between (mainly professional) rugby league clubs from  the  county of Yorkshire. The actual area was at times increased to encompass other teams from  outside the  county such as Newcastle, Mansfield, Coventry, and even London (in the form of Acton & Willesden).

The Rugby League season always (until the onset of "Summer Rugby" in 1996) ran from around August-time through to around May-time and this competition always took place early in the season, in the Autumn, with the final taking place in (or just before) December (The only exception to this was when disruption of the fixture list was caused during, and immediately after, the two World Wars)

See also 
1991–92 Rugby Football League season
Rugby league county cups

References

External links
Saints Heritage Society
1896–97 Northern Rugby Football Union season at wigan.rlfans.com 
Hull&Proud Fixtures & Results 1896/1897
Widnes Vikings - One team, one passion Season In Review - 1896–97
The Northern Union at warringtonwolves.org

RFL Yorkshire Cup
Yorkshire Cup